Boca Raton is a city in Florida, United States.

Boca Raton may also refer to these places or organizations within the city:

 Boca Raton Resort, a club and former Ritz-Carlton resort
 Boca Raton Airport (BCT, KBCT)
 Boca Raton Army Airfield
 Boca Raton (Tri-Rail station)
 Boca Raton Florida East Coast Railway Station
 Boca Raton Rugby Football Club
 Boca Raton Community High School
 Lynn University, formerly known as the College of Boca Raton

See also 

 
 
 Boca (disambiguation)
 Raton (disambiguation)